Benjamin Jake Fox (born 1 February 1998) is an English professional footballer who plays as a midfielder for EFL League Two side Northampton Town.

Fox came through the youth academy at Burton Albion and progressed to the first team where he made 37 league appearances over a 5 year spell. Whilst with Albion he spent time on loan with non-league sides Tamworth, Solihull Moors, Gateshead and Barnet.

Fox moved to Grimsby Town in the summer of 2021 and was part of the team that won promotion to the Football League by winning the National League play offs in 2022. On June 17, 2022, Fox signed a two year deal with Northampton Town.

Career

Burton Albion
Fox was included in the first team squad during the 2016–17 season, and was allocated the number 21 squad number. He was given his debut in the EFL Cup match against Liverpool on 23 August 2016, coming on as a 65th-minute substitute for Lloyd Dyer, a game in which Burton lost 5–0. Fox was given his EFL Championship debut on 17 September 2016, coming on as 77th-minute substitute for Hamza Choudhury in a home game against Brighton & Hove Albion which they lost 1–0. He scored his first goal for Burton in an EFL Cup tie against Cardiff City on 22 August 2017.

Fox joined Conference North side Tamworth on 1 December 2016, on an initial one-month loan, which was later extended to the rest of the season on 8 February 2017. The following season, he spent time on loan with Solihull Moors, had a second loan spell at Tamworth, and then went on loan for a third time that season, this time at Gateshead.

Fox broke into the first team at Burton in the 2018-19 season, but in July 2019 he was ruled out of action until March 2020 with an anterior cruciate ligament injury. In December 2020 he joined Barnet on a one-month loan, with a view to an extension until the end of the season. Fox scored on his debut in the FA Trophy against Dorking Wanderers, but later received a straight red card for a late tackle in a 3–1 defeat. His suspension, followed by subsequent match postponements, and a change of management at Burton meant this was his only game for the club.

On 12 May 2021 it was announced that he would be one of 12 players leaving Burton at the end of the season.

Grimsby Town
On 15 June 2021, Fox joined Grimsby Town on a one-year deal 

Fox earned the man of the match award as The Mariners defeated Solihull Moors 2-1 at the London Stadium in the 2022 National League play-off Final.

Northampton Town
On 17 June 2022, Fox signed for fellow EFL League Two side Northampton Town having rejected a new deal from Grimsby.

Career statistics

Honours
Grimsby Town
National League play-off winners: 2022

References

External links

1998 births
Living people
English footballers
Association football midfielders
Burton Albion F.C. players
Tamworth F.C. players
Gateshead F.C. players
Barnet F.C. players
Grimsby Town F.C. players
Northampton Town F.C. players
English Football League players
National League (English football) players
Sportspeople from Burton upon Trent